Dorbod (Siziwang) Banner is a banner (county equivalent) in Ulanqab, Inner Mongolia, China, bordering Mongolia's Dornogovi Province to the northwest.

The banner spans , and has a population of 129,372 as of 2020. Its seat of government is located in Wulanhua.

Toponymy 
The Chinese name for the banner siziwang, literally "four princes", derives from the area's historic rule by four brothers. The Mongolian name for the banner dorbed means "of four".

History 

The area of Dorbod Banner was ruled by four Mongol brothers, Sengge, Suonuobu, Emubu and Yi'erzhamu, who were descendants of Hasar, a brother of Genghis Khan. They led their tribe in participating in the Manchu Qing Dynasty's conquest of Ming China in the early 17th century. In recognition of their service, the Qing court made Emubu the Duoluo Commandery Prince in 1649 and settled their tribe in the area of modern Siziwang Banner. The title was hereditary and passed through fourteen of his descendants before the Communist Party of China abolished all hereditary titles in Inner Mongolia in 1949. The last prince, Sudanamuchaogeji, died as a private citizen in 1957. There is a sculpture of the four original princes in Wulanhua, erected in 2003.

Geography 
To its east lies Sonid Right Banner, Qahar Right Rear Banner, and Qahar Right Middle Banner. To its south lies Wuchuan County and Zhuozi County. To its west lies Darhan Muminggan United Banner. Its north is formed by a  border with Mongolia.

Most of the banner's area is grassland.

Climate 

Administrative divisions 
Dorbod Banner is divided into five towns, three townships, five sums, and one other township-level division.

Demographics 
As of 2009, the banner is home to 216,990 people, up from the 180,568 reported in the 2000 Census.

The banner's ethnic minorities include 18,902 Mongols (8.71% of the total population), 1,086 Manchus (0.50%), and 837 Hui people (0.39%).

Economy 
Mineral deposits in the banner include gold, copper, nickel, manganese, fluorite, gypsum, coal, and thenardite.

Spacecraft landing site 
The banner served as the landing sites for China's Shenzhou program.

A specially constructed  road runs from Wulanhua to Honggor to aid the recovery of the Shenzhou spacecraft, and to boost the local economy. This road shortened the journey between the two towns from two hours to just 40 minutes.

Chinese space program recovery teams (with SUV and recovery trucks) track the progress of re-entry near the landing site and arrive shortly after landing.

A small recovery trucks fitted with a crane lifts the capsule and places it on the rear of the truck for transportation back to the space centre.

Since the final landing of Shenzhou 11 in Dorbod Banner in 2016, new facilities have been built to hasten the retrieval process for various spacecraft.

In December 2020, the Chang'e 5 spacecraft landed in Dorbod Banner following a successful collection of Moon rocks.

See also 
 Chinese space program

Notes

References

Citations

News 

Ulanqab
Spaceports in China
Banners of Inner Mongolia